Abrahámovce may refer to several places in Slovakia:

Abrahámovce, Bardejov
Abrahámovce, Kežmarok